A hood unit, in North American railroad terminology, is a body style for diesel and electric locomotives where the body is less than full-width for most of its length and walkways are on the outside.  In contrast, a cab unit has a full-width carbody for the length of the locomotive and walkways inside.  A hood unit has sufficient visibility to be operated in both directions from a single cab. Also, the locomotive frame is the main load-bearing member, allowing the hood to be non-structural and easily opened or even removed for maintenance.

History
The hood unit evolved from the switcher locomotive. A switcher's long hood is normally low enough that the crew can see over it, and there typically is no short hood.  Alco introduced the road switcher concept with the RS-1, which was an enlarged switcher with a short hood ahead of the cab.  This was added to provide protection for the crew in case of a collision. The low long hood was retained, though its increased length made visibility over it useless. Later, EMD introduced the GP7, which had a similar layout, though both hoods were as high as the cab roof.  The high long hood became standard for virtually all hood unit locomotives thereafter.

The long hood of a locomotive is usually about as tall as the cab roof in order to fit the large prime mover and its related subsystems.  Originally the short hood of the locomotive was the same height, which is referred to as a high-nose or, confusingly, high short hood.  Starting in the mid to late 1950s, the height of the short hood was reduced to increase visibility, creating a low-nose or low short hood locomotive.  Some locomotives that were originally built with a high nose were later modified to have a low nose.  Lately it has become common to make the short hood not only lower but also full-width, creating a wider nose which is usually referred to as a North American Safety Cab or Canadian comfort cab.

The visibility and access advantages mean that the hood unit is overwhelmingly the most popular style of locomotive in North America, as well as many other regions.

Operation
Although the crew cabin is centered on some hood units (particularly in the case of dual, relatively small prime-movers), in most cases the cab is closer to one end of the locomotive than the other (in the case of a single, relatively large prime-mover), breaking the locomotive up into long hood and short hood sections.  It is generally preferred to run a hood unit short hood forward so that the cab is closer to the front, but there is enough visibility in the other direction that they can run long hood forward at regular speeds.  Some railroad companies (notably, the Norfolk & Western and the Southern) ordered locomotives with cabs facing long hood forward so that the short hood is actually the rear of the locomotives, but that practice has become increasingly rare.  This was usually done to offer greater protection to the crew in the event of a collision.  Other locomotives were set up with dual control stands so that they could operate in both directions, making it unnecessary to turn the locomotive around at the end of a run.  Some cabless hood units were also built.  The long hood ran the whole length of those locomotives. In North America, all locomotives are required to have the letter F printed on the side sill at the end which is normally operated as its front.

Freight-oriented hood units
 EMD GP7
 EMD GP9
 EMD GP20
 EMD GP28
 EMD GP30
 EMD GP35
 EMD GP38-2
 EMD GP40-2
 EMD GP50
 EMD GP60
 EMD SD7
 EMD SD9
 EMD SD24
 EMD SD38-2
 EMD SD39
 EMD SD39-2
 EMD SD40
 EMD SD40-2
 EMD SD45
 EMD SD45-2
 EMD SD50
 EMD SD60
 EMD SD70 series
 EMD SD75I
 EMD SD75M
 EMD SD80MAC
 EMD SD90MAC
 EMD DD35
 EMD DD35A
 EMD DDA40X
 GE U23B
 GE U23C
 GE U25B
 GE U25C
 GE U28C
 GE U30B
 GE U30C
 GE U33B
 GE U33C
 GE U36B
 GE U36C
 GE U50
 GE U50C
 GE Dash 7 Series
 GE Dash 8 Series
 GE Dash 9 Series
 GE AC4400CW
 GE AC6000CW
 GE Evolution Series

Passenger-oriented hood units
 Brookville BL20GH
 GP40TC
 EMD GP40P
 EMD GP40P-2
 EMD GP40PH-2
 EMD GP39H-2
 EMD GP40WH-2
 EMD GP40-3H
EMD GP40MC
 EMD SDP35
 EMD SDP40
 EMD SDP45
EMD SD70MACH
 GE U28CG
 GE U34CH
 GE Dash 8-32BWH
 MPI MP32PH-Q

United Kingdom
The term "hood unit" is not used in the UK but a few locomotives of the hood unit type are in service. Some of these locomotives may also be classified as cab forwards when running in reverse.
 British Rail Class 70 (introduced 2009)
 British Rail Class 08 (introduced 1952)
 British Rail Class 09 (introduced 1959)
 British Rail Class 20 (introduced 1957)

Withdrawn hood unit types include:
 British Rail 10800
 British Rail Class 15
 British Rail Class 16
 British Rail Class 58

France 
The term "hood unit" is not used in France but a few locomotives of the hood unit type are or were in service:
 BB 63000
 BB 66000
 BB 66400
 Y 8000

Turkey
Almost all Turkish locomotives have this design. Cab units recently imported and produced under licence.

Czechoslovakia
Locomotives of the hood unit type in  Czech are:
 ChME3

China
Locomotives of the hood unit type in China are:
 China Railways DF2
 China Railways DF4DD
 China Railways DF5
 China Railways DF7
 China Railways DF7B
 China Railways DF7C
 China Railways DF7E
 China Railways DF7G
 China Railways DF10DD
 China Railways DF12
 China Railways HXN3B
 China Railways HXN5
 China Railways HXN5B

South Korea
 Korail DEL2000 series (EMD SW8, EMD-GMC, USA, Introduced in 1951 by US army during Korea War and donated to Korea National Railroad, DEL2001, the first locomotive, is conserved as a cultural property)
 Korail DEL2100 series (EMD SW1000, EMD-GMC, USA, Introduced in 1969)
 Korail DEL3000 series (EMD G8, EMD-GMC, USA, Introduced in 1958)
 Korail DEL3100, 3200 series (DL532, ALCO, USA, Introduced in 1966, Configured by EMD-GMC components after defunct of ALCO)
 Korail DEL4000,4100,4300 series (EMD G12, EMD-GMC, USA, Introduced in 1963)
 Korail DEL4200 series (EMD G22, EMD-GMC, USA, Introduced in 1967)
 Korail DEL4400 series (GT18B-M, Hyundai Rotem, South Korea, Introduced in 2001)
 Korail DEL5000 series (EMD SD9, EMD-GMC, USA, Introduced in 1957)
 Korail DEL6000 series (EMD SD18, EMD-GMC, USA, Introduced in 1963)
 Korail DEL6100 series (EMD SDP28, EMD-GM, USA, Introduced in 1966)
 Korail DEL6200 series (EMD SDP38, EMD-GM, USA, Introduced in 1967)
 Korail DEL6300 series (G26CW, EMD-GM, USA, Introduced in 1969)
 Korail DEL7100, 7200, 7500 series (GT26CW, EMD-GM, USA, Introduced in 1975)
 Korail DEL7300, 7400 series (GT26CW-2, Hyundai Rotem, South Korea, Introduced in 1989, Licensed Production )

References

Locomotive body styles